Sumikko Gurashi (すみっコぐらし) is a set of fictional characters produced by the Japanese company San-X. The name roughly translates to "life in the corner". The main Sumikko characters are Shirokuma, a polar bear who dislikes the cold, Penguin? who is unsure of being a penguin, Tonkatsu, a piece of leftover pork cutlet, Neko, a timid and anxious cat, and Tokage, a dinosaur who pretends to be a lizard. Minor Minniko characters include Furoshiki, a polka dot furoshiki cloth, Zassou, a weed with a positive attitude, and Tapioca, multi-colored leftover tapioca pearls. The characters were created by Yuri Yokomizo, a graphic designer working for San-X, and the first products were released in 2012. Their main inspiration was the feeling of comfort when one is near a corner, and they were based on Yokomizo's notebook doodles when she was a student. A wealth of merchandise, such as stationery, plush toys, and clothing, is sold. Books, mobile apps, and video games based on the franchise have also been produced. Two animated films with Sumikko Gurashi were released in 2019 and 2021.

Background 
Targeting Japanese people with an affinity for "corners", such as the corner seat of a café or the corner of a room, the characters are anthropomorphised animals and food items. The characters are split into "Sumikko", the main characters, and "Minikko", the smaller side characters. The main characters have common traits: they have a slightly negative personality, they are castaways in everyday life, and they feel most relaxed when they are near a corner. In contrast, some of the Minikko characters have a more positive outlook, like Zassou, the weed with big dreams.

Yuri Yokomizo was a new designer when she developed the Sumikko Gurashi characters in her first year of joining San-X. Before getting hired at San-X, Yokomizo studied graphic design at Tama Art University where Hikaru Suemasa, creator of the San-X character Tarepanda, was one of her professors. Yokomizo based the Sumikko Gurashi characters on doodles she made in the corners of her notebooks as a student. They were first conceived as a series of cute animal characters, and early concept art included a sheep and a giraffe.  The addition of the leftover pork cutlet character Tonkatsu shifted the focus. Yokomizo said in 2015 that characters like Tonkatsu and Tapioca were inspired by a feeling of pity for that which is left over. In 2019 Yokomizo said that some parts of the books are based on her own experiences, like a scene where the characters are afraid of answering the phone.

In 2019, The Japan Times described Sumikko Gurashi as being part of a trend which first began with the release of the San-X character Rilakkuma in 2003, where characters have more negative personality traits compared to earlier kawaii (cute) characters which were more cheerful or bland. Marceline Smith, author of a book about kawaii, described Sumikko Gurashi as "characters that feel left out or anxious" which makes them "more relevant for a generation who face greater uncertainty in their lives".

History and products 
San-X released the first Sumikko Gurashi products in September 2012, which included stationery and plush toys. A variety of merchandise followed, such as clothing, kitchenware and bags. The Sumikko Gurashi Collection is a series of plush items, consisting of palm sized plush dolls and plush dollhouses, furniture, outfits etc. in size for the dolls. As of 2018 it includes over 300 different items. Sumikko merchandise has been released with different themes, like seasonal items, depicting Sumikko wearing hats and mufflers in the winter, or depicting them at a beach holding watermelons in the summer. Other themes show the Sumikko participating in various activities, like studying or sports, or in locations like a cafe or a dagashiya candy store. Some of the themes are reflected in short stories featured in books and magazines, on the San-X website, and in short promotional films with simple animation San-X publish on their YouTube channel. As of 2019, San-X had a team of about 25 people working on Sumikko Gurashi product development.

The first Sumikko Gurashi books were released in 2014, and as of 2018 over 30 different books have been released, including story books, fan books, activity books, and mooks with enclosed items. There have also been several Nintendo 3DS and Nintendo Switch games, and several mobile games, including Sumikko Gurashi—Our Puzzling Ways and SumiSumi. For the 5th anniversary in 2017, San-X released birthday themed merchandise and held different events around Japan, like pop-up cafes and exhibitions. Also, a commemorative train decorated with Sumikko Gurashi characters ran on the Yamanote Line in July and August 2017.

Sumikko Gurashi is also promoted in Taiwan, and is known as Jiǎoluò Xiǎohuǒbàn (角落小夥伴, lit. "Little Corner Partners") or Jiǎoluò shēngwù (角落生物, lit. "Corner Creatures") in Chinese. In 2017, Sumikko Gurashi merchandise started selling in North American stores such as Books-a-Million and Barnes and Noble.

According to San-X, in 2015 Sumikko Gurashi stood for 30% of sales of their original merchandise, or about 5 billion yen. As of 2019 sales of Sumikko products were worth about 20 billion yen a year. Eight million plush toys and 3 million books had been sold. Sumikko Gurashi was ranked #10 in 2016, and #5 in 2018 on character popularity charts from Bandai, based on surveys of parents of children under 12 in Japan. In 2019 Sumikko Gurashi won the Grand Prize at the Japan Character Awards. 

For the 10th anniversary in 2022, San-x started the "Let's connect through Sumikko project" where the Sumikko characters, among other things, act as tourism ambassador for selected towns and areas in Japan.

Films

For the seventh anniversary in 2019 an anime film was released, called . The film was produced by the studio Fanworks who previously made the Aggretsuko series. It was directed by Mankyū, with the script written by Takashi Sumita and Kaori Hino was art director. It opened in 114 theaters in Japan in November, and ranked #3 on opening weekend and rose to #2 the week after. It grossed a total of 1.45 billion yen in 2019 and won Best Animation of the Year at the Japanese Movie Critics Awards.

In 2021, a second movie was released, . It was directed by Takahiro Omori with a screenplay by Reiko Yoshida. Like the first movie, it was produced by Fanworks with art directing by Kaori Hino. The theme song was performed by the alternative rock group Bump of Chicken. Yuri Yokomizo made rough sketches for character designs and collaborated with the movie design team in creating the concept. Much of the work on the movie was done remotely, using screen sharing. It opened in 184 theaters and was #2 at the weekend box office, going up to #1 the week after. As of January 2022 the total box office was over 1 billion yen.

Characters

Sumikko 
 Shirokuma (しろくま shirokuma) is a shy polar bear who ran away from arctic circle. It is sensitive to the cold, and feels most at home while drinking hot tea in the corner. It likes to draw and to bathe in hot springs, and has an easygoing personality. Furoshiki, the pink cloth with cream yellow polka dots, is its most prized possession. It heard from the traveling Penguin (Real) that there were warm seas in the south, so it ran away from the polar region and ended up in the corner with the other Sumikko. Shirokuma was originally a white rabbit in an early concept sketch.
 Penguin? (ぺんぎん？ pengin?) resembles a green penguin, but is unsure if it really is one. It likes eating cucumbers and has vague memories of having a plate on its head (both of which strongly imply that it is a kappa). Since it uses sneaky ways to take the corner for itself, the Arm often picks it up and away. It likes to read and listen to music. In early concept sketches, it was portrayed as a penguin who sunbathes until it turns green from moss growing on it.
 Tonkatsu (とんかつ tonkatsu) is an edge slice from a fried pork cutlet. It is composed of 1% meat and 99% fat, so it was left behind on its plate after the meal finished. It often puts condiments like sauce, salt, and mustard on itself to assert that it is still edible. Despite being food, it can eat from its mouth, which makes up its 1% portion of meat. Since it is covered with batter, it refries itself instead of bathing. It likes to hang out with Ebifurai no Shippo, the fried shrimp tail.
 Neko (ねこ neko) is a timid and socially anxious calico cat. It is self-conscious about its rotundity. It often gives the corner away to other Sumikko because of its personality. It feels safe when snugly covered, like in a pouch or under an empty cat food can. It often files its nails on the walls of the corner. It has a wallet and acts as the treasurer of the group. Its favorite foods are rice balls, cat grass, canned cat food, and fish. It does not like mandarins because it mistakes their sour smell as a sign of rotting. It briefly reunited with two estranged siblings in a 2019 theme.
 Tokage (とかげ tokage) is an aquatic dinosaur who poses as a lizard to avoid being captured. It was separated from its mother, but they later reunited. It is friends with Nisetsumuri, the fake snail, and Tokage (Real), who is an actual lizard. Its favorite food is fish, so it associates with Neko. It occasionally dives for fresh fish for Neko. Tokage was not part of the original 2012 lineup of characters, but was added after about three years.

Minniko 
 Furoshiki (ふろしき furoshiki) is Shirokuma's pink furoshiki cloth with cream-colored spots. Shirokuma often uses it to claim a corner spot, as a blanket, and in many other ways.
 Zassou (ざっそう zassō) is a shrub of weed that has big dreams and a positive attitude. Its dream is to be used in a bouquet at a flower shop one day. Because Neko waters it often, it is the closest with it.
 Ebifurai No Shippo (えびふらいのしっぽ ebifurai no shippo) is the leftover tail of a fried shrimp. Because of their similar past, it is good friends with Tonkatsu. Like Tonkatsu, it refries itself instead of taking baths, and likes to apply tartar sauce to itself, or hold a cherry tomato.
 Tapioca (たぴおか tapioca) are tapioca pearls left over from a cup of milk tea. When they were still floating in the milk tea, they were smiling, but now their expression is emotionless. They come in pastel yellow, blue, and pink, as well as black. The rarer black Tapioca are more mischievous than the others.
 Hokori (ほこり hokori) are wisps of dust accumulated in the corner. As with the Tapioca, there are multiple Hokori, but they can also combine and dissipate. They are weak against water.
 Suzume (すずめ suzume) is a sparrow that flies by to nibble on Tonkatsu's crumbs.
 Nisetsumuri (にせつむり nisetsumuri) is a slug who carries a shell on its back and pretends to be a snail. Because of its guilt over its dishonesty, it apologizes more than necessary. Because of their similar false identity, it is closest friends with Tokage.
 Obake (おばけ obake) is a timid ghost that likes funny things, but avoids laughing to avoid scaring people with its big mouth. It lives in a corner of the attic and likes to clean, and is also seen working part-time at the Kissa Sumikko (corner cafe) (喫茶すみっコ kissasumikko).
 Yama (やま yama) a small, conical, white-and-blue mountain that admires Mount Fuji. It appears at hot springs, standing in for the paintings of Mt. Fuji one often sees at a Sentō. It turns red when entering hot springs.

Other 
 Arm (アーム āmu) is a robot arm similar to that of a UFO catcher. It occasionally appears to snatch Sumikko (Penguin? being its favorite catch), who attempts to steal the corner with illegitimate means. On one hand, it is feared by the Sumikko, but on the other hand, sometimes it takes care of their well being.
 Mogura (もぐら mogura) is a grey mole that used to live in a corner underground. Because of the commotion above ground, it became curious about it and surfaced for the first time. Likes to wear red boots.
 Fukuro (ふくろう fukurō) is a nocturnal owl who keeps trying its best to stay up in daytime.
 Penguin (Real) (ぺんぎん（本物）pengin (honmono)) is a friendly and approachable penguin who travels around the world. It informed Shirokuma of warmer regions in the south. It shared its souvenirs with the Sumikko, such as rock salt, pearls, and photographs, which it stores in a blue and white striped furoshiki cloth.
 Sumi-ssie (スミッシー sumisshī, derived from ネッシー nesshī meaning "Nessie") is a long-necked creature that appeared in Sumik-ko (corner lake) (すみっ湖 sumikko, punning on -湖 -ko, a suffix for lake names). She is Tokage's long-lost mother, and a very gentle dinosaur, who came from the sea to visit Tokage. Since the other Sumikko do not know that Tokage is a dinosaur, they have not realized that Sumi-ssie is its mother.
 Tokage (Real) (とかげ（本物） tokage (honmono)) is a real lizard who lives in the forest. It is a friend of Tokage who has a carefree personality and doesn't care about the details.
 Mamemaster (まめマスター mamemasutaa) a black coffee bean who is the master at the Kissa Sumikko cafe where Obake works.

References

External links
Official Website 
Official Website 

San-X characters
Fanworks (animation studio)